Kazi Mofazzal Hossain Shaikat (born 20 June 1986) is a retired Bangladeshi professional footballer who played as a centre back.

International career

Bangladesh national team
On 23 July 2009, During Dido's reign as the Bangladesh national football team head coach, Mofazzal along with seven other players walked out of the national team camp after receiving punishment training, this led to the coach requesting the Bangladesh Football Federation for the particular players to be dismissed. The BFF president Kazi Salahuddin, had to intervene to solve the situation, which resulted in all Mofazzal and the 8 other players being fined a month's salary. Soon after the incident Dido resigned after a fallout with the national team management committee. Mofazzal's international career also ended that year, as he only managed to make four appearances for the team. During his first game for the country, Shaikat was sent off against Afghanistan, after picking up a double booking.

References

Living people
1986 births
People from Noakhali District
Mohammedan SC (Dhaka) players
Muktijoddha Sangsad KC players
Abahani Limited (Dhaka) players
Bangladeshi footballers
Bangladesh international footballers
Association football defenders